Rhys Hanbury (born 27 August 1985) is an Australian professional rugby league footballer who last played for the Widnes Vikings in the Super League.

He previously played for the Wests Tigers in the National Rugby League (NRL).

He played junior football with Illawarra Wests.

Although he was expected to make his début for Crusaders against Wigan Warriors on 5 February at the DW Stadium, visa issues made him unavailable until 11 April match versus Wakefield Trinity.

South Sydney Rabbitohs
Rhys made his first grade début for the South Sydney Rabbitohs against Penrith Panthers. He made just two appearances for the club, partaking in a loss and a draw. He was released and transferred to Wests Tigers in NRL 2008.

Wests Tigers

Rhys made his Wests Tigers début in a Round 2 fixture against North Queensland Cowboys. Star Benji Marshall was injured the round before but Hanbury nevertheless helped the Tigers to an emphatic 30-10 win. Hanbury made nineteen further appearances over the 2008 & 2009 seasons and in these appearances went over the try line four times. However the Tigers failed to make the NRL Finals both times and Hanbury signed for Crusaders for the 2010 season.

Crusaders RL

Hanbury enjoyed a successful Crusaders season in 2010. First picked on the bench against Wakefield Trinity, he scored his first two tries against York City Knights in the Carnegie Challenge Cup. Hanbury would finish the 2010 season joint top scorer with 12 tries; yet he had only twenty appearances, four less than joint top scorer Vince Mellars.

His 2011 season did not go to plan however. Plagued with injuries, he made just ten appearances with four tries. It was announced that he would move to Widnes for the 2012 season alongside team mates Lloyd White and Frank Winterstein after the Welsh club's withdrawal from Super League.

Widnes Vikings

Hanbury débuted for the Widnes Vikings in the first game of the season against Wakefield Trinity. An impressive kick put Willie Isa through to score but the video referee spotted a pull on Peter Fox by Patrick Ah Van and disallowed the try. Widnes would eventually lose the game. Rhys Hanbury scored consecutive points in rounds two and three - a goal against Salford Red Devils  and a try against newly crowned World Club Challenge champions Leeds Rhinos. Hanbury helped Widnes to a 38-30 win over the London Broncos with his second Widnes try. His third was a consolation in a 38-4 defeat by the Bradford Bulls.

Career highlights
First Grade Debut: 2004 - Round 9, South Sydney Rabbitohs vs Penrith Panthers, 16 March
Wests Tigers Debut: 2008 - Wests Tigers vs North Queensland Cowboys, Round 2
First Try: 2008 - Wests Tigers
Crusaders Debut: 2010 - Crusaders vs Wakefield Trinity
Widnes Debut: 2012 - Widnes vs Wakefield Trinity, Round 1

References

External links
Widnes Vikings profile
Rhys Hanbury at Wests Tigers
Balmain Tigers
SL profile

1985 births
Living people
Australian rugby league players
Australian expatriate sportspeople in England
Balmain Ryde-Eastwood Tigers players
Crusaders Rugby League players
Rugby league five-eighths
Rugby league fullbacks
Rugby league halfbacks
Rugby league players from Wollongong
Rugby league wingers
South Sydney Rabbitohs players
Wests Tigers players
Widnes Vikings players